Giancarlo Ferretti (born 16 October 1941 in Lugo)  is the former manager of the now-disbanded Italian professional road bicycle racing team, Fassa Bortolo, sponsored by the Italian cement company of the same name.

Fassa Bortolo was a top-ranked team until the 2005 season, during which it was part of the UCI ProTour.  Among its former riders was classics specialist Michele Bartoli, super-sprinter Alessandro Petacchi, stage racer Ivan Basso, Juan Antonio Flecha, time trial specialist Fabian Cancellara, and many others.

In pursuit of new sponsorship for the team, Ferretti  believed that Sony Ericsson was interested. However, on 14 October 2005, a man claiming to represent proposed new sponsor Sony Ericsson turned out to be an impostor, leaving all staff and riders unemployed.

His strong personality earned him the nickname the iron sergeant. He  has been criticized by former riders for being too demanding, strict, and commanding.  Uniquely in cycling, when he was the manager of Fassa Bortolo he was made an employee of Fassa Bortolo, the company, and earned some respect for it.

References

1941 births
Living people
Cycle racing in Italy
People from Lugo, Emilia-Romagna
Cyclists from Emilia-Romagna
Sportspeople from the Province of Ravenna